Brasiguaio (Portuguese) or brasiguayo (Spanish) is a term referring to Brazilian migrants in Paraguay and their descendants. The word Brasiguaio has been used by members within and outside this group to categorize individuals whose lives are connected with both Brazil and Paraguay, and more specifically to refer to Brazilians who live or have lived in Paraguay. They typically live in the Southeastern Paraguayan departments of Canindeyú and Alto Paraná, which border with Brazil. Most emigrated from Brazil by the 1960s. In total they make up 455,000 Brasiguaios , or about one-tenth of Paraguay's population.

In some border zones, Brasiguayos and their descendants are more than 90% of the population, where Portuguese is still spoken as the mother tongue. In San Alberto de Mbaracayú city, approximately 80% of its 23,000 inhabitants are of Brazilian ancestry. The origins of Brasiguayos are from the three states of the South Region of Brazil, Paraná, Santa Catarina, and Rio Grande do Sul. Most Brasiguayos are mainly ethnically White of German, Italian, and Polish descent.

See also
 Brazil–Paraguay relations

References

External links 
 La presencia incómoda de los "brasiguayos" - Terramérica
Folha de S.Paulo article (Brazilian newspaper)
Revista do Mercosul (Mercosur Magazine)
 San Alberto Journal: Awful Lot of Brazilians in Paraguay, Locals Say - The New York Times
 BRAZIL: Brazilians in Paraguay

Ethnic groups in Paraguay
Immigration to Paraguay
Paraguay
Brazil–Paraguay border